The 1952 Bermuda air crash occurred on 6 December 1952, when a Douglas DC-4, registered CU-T397 and operated by Cubana de Aviación, flying from Madrid to Havana, crashed into the Atlantic Ocean following a refuelling stop at Kindley Air Force Base in Bermuda. There were 33 passengers and 8 crew on board the aircraft. The flight arrived at Kindley Air Force Base at 03:30. After an hour's stopover spent refuelling the aircraft, the DC-4 departed; at 04:45, during the initial climb, the aircraft stalled, lost height and crashed tail first into the sea. The accident killed 37 passengers and crew; three passengers and a crew-member survived the crash, and were rescued shortly after the crash.

Bermuda's Director of Civil Aviation, E. M. Ware, said at the time that the take-off apparently had been normal. It is believed no message came from the plane before it plunged into the sea, probably while still pushing the engines hard to gain altitude. Four survivors were taken to the Kindley base hospital.

The cause of the accident was not determined; it remains the worst aviation accident in Bermudian history.

References

Aviation accidents and incidents in 1952
Accidents and incidents involving the Douglas DC-4
Cubana de Aviación accidents and incidents
1952 in Bermuda
December 1952 events in North America